Margasahayesvarar Temple, Muvalur is a Siva temple in Muvalur in Mayiladuthurai district in Tamil Nadu (India).

Vaippu Sthalam
It is one of the shrines of the Vaippu Sthalams sung by Tamil Saivite Nayanar Appar.

Presiding deity
The presiding deity is Margasahayesvarar. The Goddess is known as Soundaranayaki.

Speciality
As this place was worshipped by Brahma, Vishnu, and Shiva this place is known as Town of the Trinity or Moovalur. This place is also known as Punnahavanam.

References

Hindu temples in Mayiladuthurai district
Shiva temples in Mayiladuthurai district